Pedro de Acuña y Meneses, Marqués de Assentar (1607 to 1674), also known as Pedro da Cunha, was a Portuguese-born nobleman and soldier who served in the Spanish army during the 17th century. Appointed commander of the Army of Flanders in 1673, he was killed on 11 August 1674 at the Battle of Seneffe, then in the Spanish Netherlands.

Personal details
Pedro de Acuña y Meneses was born in 1607 in Santar, part of the Braga District in Portugal, only child of Lope da Cunha (1590-circa 1659), Lord of Santar, and his wife Violante da Meneses. 
He married Francisca de la Cueva Enríquez (1640-1666), Lady-in-waiting to Queen Mariana of Austria; she died giving birth to a daughter, Manuela (1666-1706), who became the second wife of her maternal uncle Isidoro Melchor, Marqués de Bedmar (1652-1723).

Career
At the time of his birth, Portugal was part of the Iberian Union with Spain; his father was a member of the Council of Castile who was made Count of Sentar in 1636, while Pedro himself received the title Marqués de Assentar. When Portugal revolted in 1640 and declared its independence, the family remained loyal to Spain and was forced into exile in Madrid. In the first part of the Thirty Years War, Assentar served in Flanders, then transferred to Italy during the Franco-Spanish War (1635–1659). Appointed commander of the Tercio of Savoy in 1655, he led the defence of Pavia against a French army in 1655 and took part in the battle of Fortana-Santa in 1656. He inherited his father's title some time before 1659, when he took over the Tercio of Lombardy. 

He became military commander of Novara in 1662, an important commercial centre in the Spanish-ruled Duchy of Milan, before being appointed Governor of Ceuta three years later. In 1673, Spain became involved in the Franco-Dutch War as an ally of the Dutch Republic and Assentar transferred to the Spanish Netherlands as commander of the Army of Flanders. On 11 August 1674, his unit formed part of an Allied army led by William of Orange which sought to outflank French forces under Condé near Seneffe. Taken by surprise, the Spanish infantry held their positions for most of the day, their courage and discipline helping to rescue William from what could otherwise have been a serious defeat. They were finally forced to retreat in the early evening, leaving behind their dead; these included Assentar, whose body was later returned by Condé for burial.

References

Sources
 
 
 
 

1607 births
1674 deaths
Spanish generals
17th-century Spanish people
Military personnel of the Thirty Years' War
Military personnel of the Franco-Dutch War
Military personnel of the Franco-Spanish War (1635–1659)